The men's parallel bars gymnastic event at the 2015 Pan American Games was held on July 15 at the Toronto Coliseum.

Schedule
All times are Eastern Standard Time (UTC-3).

Results

Qualification

Final

References

Gymnastics at the 2015 Pan American Games